O: The 2nd Asia Tour (stylized as TVXQ! The 2nd Asia Tour Concert "O"), was the second Asia-wide concert tour (third overall) by South Korean pop group TVXQ, launched in support of the group's third Korean studio album, "O"-Jung.Ban.Hap. (2006). Selling out almost all shows in arenas and stadiums across Asia throughout 2007 and 2008, the O Tour was TVXQ's most commercially successful international concert tour with an audience of 390,000.

The tour commenced with three shows in Seoul, South Korea from February 23 to 25, 2007 at the Olympic Gymnastics Arena. The theme of the concert war and peace, which was inspired by the lyrics in their album's lead single, "'O'-Jung.Ban.Hap." The members of TVXQ were presented as warriors of peace, descending to earth to protect humanity from war and corruption. The show was divided into twelve segments, including the encore. The setlist was mostly composed of songs from TVXQ's first three studio albums. The tour concluded in Beijing, China on June 12, 2008 at the Fengtai Stadium.

Background
After embarking on their first Japanese concert tour, the Heart, Mind and Soul Tour, TVXQ returned to South Korea in late 2006 to release their third Korean studio album, "O"-Jung.Ban.Hap. The album sold 350,000 copies in three months, becoming the best-selling album of 2006. On January 8, 2007, TVXQ's agency announced the O Tour and revealed its official promotional poster as well as the tour's plans to perform 14 shows in 7 cities across Asia. The cities included Seoul, Beijing, Shanghai, Taipei, Hong Kong Bangkok, and Kuala Lumpur; however, the date for the Hong Kong leg never took place.

Ticket sales for the tour's first three stops in Seoul were made available on January 15, 2007 through Inter Park. The tour kicked off with a three-night residency at the Olympic Gymnastics Arena in Seoul from February 23 to 25, 2007. It held its first overseas concert in Taipei, Taiwan at the Chungshan Soccer Stadium. Due to severe weather conditions, a second show in Taipei was canceled.

Three encore dates in Seoul were announced in September 2007, and all 33,000 available tickets were sold out within a few minutes, crashing the server of Inter Park. An addition encore concert in Taipei, held at the Taipei Arena, took place on May 10, 2008.

The O Tour ended on June 12, 2008 at the Fengtai Stadium in Beijing, totaling 13 shows and attracting 390,000 fans across Asia.

Development and performance
The theme of the concert war and peace, which was inspired by the lyrics in their album's lead single, "'O'-Jung.Ban.Hap." The members of TVXQ were presented as warriors of peace, descending to earth to protect humanity from war and corruption. The stage was much more elaborate than their previous tour, with moving platforms, pyrotechnics, moving props, and wire fu, totaling a cost of US$1.6 million. The members of TVXQ were presented as warriors of peace, with action-packed video interludes. 

The set list for the concert consisted of songs from TVXQ's first three Korean studio albums, as well as solo performances by each member. Super Junior's Donghae and Zhang Liyin remained as guest performers throughout the tour; Super Junior's Donghae was featured as a guest rapper for U-Know Yunho's solo performance "Spokesman", a number Yunho comprosed and wrote himself, while Zhang Liyin's vocals were featured in place of BoA's in TVXQ's performance of "Tri-Angle." For the Kuala Lumpur and Bangkok shows, Zhang Liyin performed her debut single "Timeless" with Xiah Junsu. During the Seoul encore shows in October 2007, Super Junior and Girls' Generation made guest appearances. Throughout the three-day encore concerts, Yunho had to perform in a separate stage platform due to a back injury he sustained during rehearsals.

Broadcasts and recordings
The February 23 to 25, 2007 shows in Seoul were recorded for CD and DVD. Prior to the concert's debut, a documentary of the band filming the concert's video interludes and concert rehearsals were aired on South Korea's Mnet. On February 26, Mnet aired a short program featuring the members getting interviewed and rehearsing in the studios. The November 24, 2007 show in Kuala Lumpur were recorded for television, and it aired on Malaysia's Mandarin Astro AEC in February 2008, airing in conjunction with the Chinese New Year.

The CD recording of the first three Seoul concerts were released on June 18, 2007, topping album charts. The CD also came with two bonus tracks, which were studio recordings of Yunho and Junsu's solos. A 2CD+DVD version was released in Taiwan through Avex Taiwan on September 28, 2007. The 2DVD Korean version was released on December 6, 2007, which included a photobook, a calendar, rehearsals, behind-the-scenes footage, interviews, and an additional music video.

Setlist
Guest acts
Donghae (all)
Zhang Liyin (all)
Super Junior (Seoul encore)
Girls' Generation (Seoul encore)

This setlist is representative of the shows in Seoul on February 23–15, 2007. It does not represent all concerts for the duration of the tour.

"Phantom 환영(幻影)"
"Million Men"
"The Way U Are" (Remix version)
"Rising Sun"
"One"
"믿어요 (Believe)" (Acoustic version)
"세상에 단 하나뿐인 마음 (You’re My Miracle)"
Xiah Junsu solo: "My Page"
Micky Yoochun solo: "One Last Cry"
U-Know Yunho solo: "Spokesman" (featuring Donghae of Super Junior)
"Hey! Girl"
"I Wanna Hold You"
Max Changmin solo: "When I First Kissed You"
Hero Jaejoong solo: "Crying"
"Drive"
"You Only Love"
"Dangerous Mind"
"Tri-Angle" (featuring Zhang Liyin)
"'O'-正.反.合." ("O"-Jung.Ban.Hap) (Rearranged)
"Remember"
Encore
"풍선 (Balloons)"
"Hi Ya Ya 여름날"
"바보 (Unforgettable)"
"Hug (포옹) (Rearranged)

Tour dates

References

External links
 TVXQ official homepage 

2007 concert tours
2008 concert tours
TVXQ concert tours